Malawimonas is a Loukozoa genus, possible sister of the Podiata.

History of the discovery of Malawimonads 
In 1993, Charles J O’ Kelly studied the jakobid groups flagellates and implications for the early diversification of eukaryotes and recognized that Jakoba, Reclimonas, and Histonia or often refer as “core jakobids” were morphologically somewhat similar. Interestingly, they included an unnamed and undescribed free-swimming, flagellate, and also groove- bearing cell.

During the early study, these cells were thought to be a member from Jakoba due to the external morphology features that resembles Jakoba libera in terms of lack of cell covering, sessile trophic stages, swimming in a similar manner and sharing the tendency for the anterior flagellum to form a “crook. However, later discovery found that this species seems to not fit and can not be assigned to the genus Jakoba, nor to any other genus of Jakobids, because of their discoidal mitochondrial cristae, which is different from Jakoba that have irregularly flattened, and the other Jakobids member have tubular mitochondrial cristae.

This undescribed organism was later described formally as Malawimonas jakobiformis and placed in its own new family Malawimonadidae, a bacterivorous heterotrophic isolated from the Malawi shore of Lake Nyasa (eastern Africa).

Only more than a decade later, a related organism has been studied under several studies that revolved around the phylogenetic positions of the Jakobids and Cercozoans group under the names Malawimonas californiana, but there are no formal descriptions included.

Characterization 

Malawimonas share some common features with the jakobids and other Excavata group members by having a conspicuous feeding grove on the ventral side and two flagellates. The overall cytoskeleton of Malawimonas resembles Carpediemonas, typical Excavata belonging to the anaerobic Metamonada clade and closely related to Diplomonads and Retormonads.

Malawimonas jakobiformis characterized by a uninucleate, biflagellate, heterotrophic, “naked” cell, where neither scales nor lorica was present. Observation of the ultrastructure revealed a substantial glycocalyx as a surface coat. The cells of Malawimonas are usually slender, and the shape is plastic and often deformed by influences such as coverslip pressure or food they digest. The two flagella are approximately 1- 1.5 times as long as the cell body and are more or less equal length. The anterior flagellum has a “crook” shape where the posterior flagellum is appresed but not attached to the ventral cell surface. Cells swim in straight lines a and turn longitudinal axes as they move. The posterior flagellar vane of Malawimonas jakobiformis arises from a clearly defined point on the ventral surface of the flagellum. In contrast, the other jakobids’ vane has a diffuse origin along the dorsal surface.

Malawimonas, Jakobids, and Mitochondrial Origin 
The early study of molecular investigations revealed that the genome of Reclinomonas americana, Jakoba libera and Malawimonas jakobiformis collectively represent the most eubacterial-like mitochondrial DNAs yet discovered among all eukaryotes. Jakobids group have all the basic forms of mitochondrial cristae known in eukaryotes. The mitochondrial shape has been seen as a strongly conserved character and is used to delimit the deepest evolutionary division within eukaryotes.

Malawimonas position within Eukaryotes 
A study based on alpha and beta- tubulin phylogenies found that Malawimonas jakobiformis occupied a relatively basal position in the plant-protists superclade and showed the distinctness from the “core jakobids”.

Molecular phylogenies have not resolved the position of malawimonads within eukaryotes. Analyses of the small number of nucleus-encoded genes often place malawimonads as close relatives of metamonads. Since 2016, most phylogenomic shows place malawimonads separately from other excavates. Phylogenesis of SSU rDNA, tubulins, 5-7 nucleus-encoded proteins, and phylogenetic analyses conclude that malawimonads are not specifically related to jakobids. The similarities between jakobids and malawimonads apparently reflect the ancestral morphology of excavate protists, or perhaps convergence, and not a close phylogenetic relationship.

References

External links
 Tree of Life: Malawimonas

Excavata genera
Scotokaryotes